In topology, an Akbulut cork is a structure that is frequently used to show that in 4-dimensions, the smooth h-cobordism theorem fails. It was named after Turkish mathematician Selman Akbulut.

A compact contractible Stein 4-manifold  with involution  on its boundary is called an Akbulut cork, if  extends to a self-homeomorphism but cannot extend to a self-diffeomorphism inside (hence a cork is an exotic copy of itself relative to its boundary).

The basic idea of the Akbulut cork is that when attempting to use the h-corbodism theorem in four dimensions, the cork is the sub-cobordism that contains all the exotic properties of the spaces connected with the cobordism, and when removed the two spaces become trivially h-cobordant and smooth. This shows that in four dimensions, although the theorem does not tell us that two manifolds are diffeomorphic (only homeomorphic), they are "not far" from being diffeomorphic.

which is the content of the h-cobordism theorem for n ≥ 5 (here int X refers to the interior of a manifold X). In addition, A and B are diffeomorphic with a diffeomorphism that is an involution on the boundary ∂A = ∂B. Therefore, it can be seen that the h-corbordism K connects A with its "inverted" image B. This submanifold A is the Akbulut cork.

Notes

References
 
 

Topology
Differential topology